Airport  is a 1993 Tamil-language action film directed by Joshi and written by S. N. Swamy. It features Sathyaraj in the main lead, along with Gautami. Unlike most films of that time and genre, it has no songs. It received positive reviews from the critics. Malayalam actor M. G. Soman played the main villain.

Plot
Captain Arjun is a pilot, who works in Indian Airlines, but only flies government planes. Once, a Union Minister calls him and tells him that his daughter, who has gone on a tour to the Pakistan border along with her friends, has been kidnapped by terrorists. The Minister asks him to bring his daughter safely, and Sathyaraj agrees to it. He flies a private helicopter to the border to bring her back, and he succeeds. Actually, the girl and her friends are terrorists whose mission is to kill the prime minister, which is the minister's master plan. One of the terrorists unknowingly leaves his passport in the helicopter. This is noticed, and Sathyaraj is arrested by Varma the police officer, since he took the helicopter in his name to transport the terrorists. Sathyaraj's widowed mother and his sister are tortured by the police. Nassar files a case on Sathyaraj for terrorist activity and weapons handling.

Sathyaraj is arrested, spends time in jail and is released after two years. Once, while chasing the minister's henchman in the streets of Delhi, he finds his sister, who was missing after his arrest two years earlier. He learns about his mother's death from Varma, the police officer. Finally, Sathyaraj plans to expose the minister to the public red handed, with the help of Jaishankar, the police I.G. But the situation worsens when the Minister takes Meenu and Captain Arjun's sister as hostages. Finally, Sathyaraj fights and kills the minister and his henchmen in a fight in the desert. The movie ends with Sathyaraj returning as a commercial pilot. They live happily ever after.

Cast
Sathyaraj as Captain Arjun
Gautami as Meenu
M. G. Soman as Senior Minister Krishnamoorthy 
Jaishankar
Nassar as Varma
Charle
Sumithra
Suchitra as Uma
Yuvasri
Ponnambalam
Thalapathy Dinesh
Ajay Ratnam
Babu Antony
Lalu Alex
Ajith Kollam
Jagannatha Varma as PM
Vijay Menon as Vijay Menon
Raja Krishnamurthy 
Appa Haja

Reception
The Indian Express wrote "Joshi's [..] treatment is skillful. [sic] The script is taut and imaginative." K. Vijiyan of New Strait Times wrote "Airport could have been a big hit if it had better music, a little comedy and better photography". R. P. R. of Kalki criticised the logical mistakes in the film and panned the story as cliched but praised the film for not having songs and concluded with "our deepest sympathies to Malayalam Joshi. The second sympathizes with fans".

References

External links

Films shot in Delhi
1993 films
Indian action thriller films
Indian aviation films
1990s Tamil-language films
Films directed by Joshiy
Indian Air Force in films
Cultural depictions of prime ministers of India
1993 action thriller films